Putra Delta Sidoarjo Football Club (simply known as PDS or PDSFC) is an Indonesian football club based in Sidoarjo Regency, East Java. They currently compete in the Liga 2. As the winner of the Group CC. Putra Delta Sidoarjo were promotion to Liga 2 next season, and in the 2022–22 Liga 3 final match, they lost against Karo United on penalties, but with his status as runner-up Liga 3 is a proud achievement for the club's history.

History
At that time the club was called Putra Jombang, after being acquired, the club changed its name to Putra Delta Sidoarjo. Putra Delta Sidoarjo was established in 2021,  Putra Delta Sidoarjo made club debut into Indonesian football by joining the third-tier league Liga 3 in 2021.

On 5 November 2021, Putra Delta Sidoarjo made their first league match debut in a 3–0 win against Assyabaab Bangil at the Gelora Delta Stadium, in the next match, they will face a team from Surabaya Arek Suroboyo. three days later, in that match, they had their second match in a 7–0 big win against Arek Suroboyo. On 14 November, they closed the match in the group stage of the 2021 Liga 3 East Java zone in a 6–0 big win against Persikoba Batu City, with this result, they qualified for round of 32 as winners Group K. After a 2–0 win over Mojosari Putra in the round of 32 and a 3–0 win over Madura FC in the round of 16. They qualified for the quarter-finals to face Persewangi Banyuwangi, but in that match, they had to lose to Persewangi Banyuwangi 1–2, as a result, failed to qualify for the semifinals of 2021 Liga 3 East Java, but still qualified for the national round of Liga 3, because in the East Java zone there were a quota of 8 clubs.

In the national round of 2021–22 Liga 3, they managed to win Group D and qualify for the round of 32. They successfully beat Benteng HB (6–1), Gasliko 50 Kota (4–1), and drew against Persikutim East Kutai (2–2), moving on to the round of 32, Putra Delta Sidoarjo is still undefeated. They managed to come out as winners of Group R and advance to the round of 16 national round of the Liga 3. In the round of 16, they won 3–1 over Persikasi Bekasi, won over Persida Sidoarjo (4–1), and drew 1–1 against Karo United. Their step for promotion in Liga 2 next season is determined in the round of 16 phase. Joined in Group CC, they succeeded in becoming the group winners and at the same time ensuring themselves to move up the caste next season. In addition, this position also brings them to appear in the semifinals of the Liga 3.

In the semifinal match, they will face Mataram Utama on 27 March 2022, and in that match, they managed to qualify for the final after winning 6–1. However, On 30 March 2022, in the final match, Putra Delta Sidoarjo failed to win because they lost to Karo United in the final on penalties which ended with a score of 4–2. with this result, they became runner-up. One of the players from Putra Delta Sidoarjo, Mochamad Adam Malik became the top scorer in 2021–22 Liga 3 with a score of 11 goals.

Players

Current squad

Coaching Staff

Honours
 Liga 3
 Runners-up: 2021–22

References

External links

Football clubs in Indonesia
Football clubs in East Java
Association football clubs established in 2021
2021 establishments in Indonesia